Rudolph Hermann Simonsen (April 30, 1889 – March 28, 1947) was a Danish composer who studied under Otto Malling. In 1928, he won a bronze medal in the art competitions of the Olympic Games for his Symphony No. 2: Hellas.

From 1931 Simonsen headed Royal Danish Academy of Music.

References

External links
 DatabaseOlympics profile
 

1889 births
1947 deaths
Danish composers
Male composers
Olympic bronze medalists in art competitions
Directors of the Royal Danish Academy of Music
Medalists at the 1928 Summer Olympics
Olympic competitors in art competitions
20th-century male musicians